Tony Lee is a British comics writer, screenwriter, audio playwright, and novelist.

Early life 
Born in 1970, Tony Lee attended Hayes Manor School, now Rosedale College.

Career 
A #1 New York Times bestselling writer, Lee has written for various UK and US comic publishers including 2000 AD, IDW Publishing, DC Comics, Marvel Comics, Del Rey and Walker Books. He has also worked on X-Men Unlimited, Doctor Who, Superboy, Star Trek, Starship Troopers, Sherlock Holmes and Spider-Man.

In 2008 Lee became the writer of the ongoing Doctor Who comic for IDW Publishing for both Tenth Doctor and Eleventh Doctor, and was one of the writers of the 2012 Star Trek: The Next Generation / Doctor Who crossover series.

Lee has also written audio dramas for Big Finish's Doctor Who, Confessions of Dorian Gray and Bernice Summerfield ranges, as well as a Robin of Sherwood audio drama for Spiteful Puppet / ITV. His novel Dodge & Twist was adapted by Lee into a full cast audio drama starring Matt Lucas for Audible/Amazon in 2019, and his adaptation of Jules Verne's Twenty Thousand Leagues Under The Sea was released in August 2020.

In 2014, Lee began writing novels aimed at reluctant teen readers. In 2021 Lee announced that he had been writing procedural crime novels for Hooded Man Media / Amazon under the pen name Jack Gatland. As of October 2022, he has released fifteen novels under the pen name.

Bibliography

Comics 
DC Comics / Zuda

Where Evils Dare (with Stefano Martino, October 2009 competition entry)
Superboy #18 (Dialogue, 2013)

Del Rey / Random House

Pride and Prejudice and Zombies: (adapted from the book by Seth Grahame-Smith and Jane Austen, 160 page graphic novel, art by Cliff Richards, May 2010)

Dynamite Entertainment

The Hollows (with Amanda Hocking), (adaptation), March 2013
Battlestar Galactica: Starbuck #1 - 4 (miniseries), November 2013
Steampunk Battlestar Galactica: 1880 #1 - 4 (miniseries), August 2014

Hachette Children's Books

The Phone Goes Dead (adapted from the book by Anthony Horowitz, 44 page graphic novella, art by Dan Boultwood (August/September 2010)
Scared (adapted from the book by Anthony Horowitz, 44 page graphic novella, art by Dan Boultwood. August/September 2010)
The Hitch-Hiker (adapted from the book by Anthony Horowitz, 44 page graphic novella, art by Dan Boultwood, August/September 2010)
Killer Camera (adapted from the book by Anthony Horowitz, 44 page graphic novella, art by Dan Boultwood, August/September 2010)
Sherlock Holmes: The Baker Street Irregulars - The Adventure Of The Missing Detective (44 page graphic novella, art by Dan Boultwood, May 2011)
Sherlock Holmes: The Baker Street Irregulars - The Adventure Of The Phantom Of Drury Lane (44 page graphic novella, art by Dan Boultwood, May 2011)
Sherlock Holmes: The Baker Street Irregulars - The Adventure Of The Charge Of The Old Brigade (44 page graphic novella, art by Dan Boultwood, June 2011)
Sherlock Holmes: The Baker Street Irregulars - The Adventure Of The Family Reunion (44 page graphic novella, art by Dan Boultwood, June 2011)
Bandits: Grandpa's Goalscarers (32 page graphic novella, art by Ben Scruton, February 2018)
Bandits: Space Corps (32 page graphic novella, art by Ryan Pentney, February 2018)
Bandits: The Timely Adventures of Captain Clock (32 page graphic novella, art by Pol Cunyat, May 2018)
Bandits: Mister Clip-Clop, Intergalactic Space Unicorn (32 page graphic novella, art by Neil Slorance, May 2018)
Bandits: Teacher Creatures (32 page graphic novella, art by Marc Ellerby, June 2018)
Bandits: The Great Pet Shop Rescue (32 page graphic novella, art by Giovanni Costa, June 2018)
Bandits: Agent of P.A.W.S (32 page graphic novella, art by Wil Overton, November 2018)
Bandits: My Little Brother's A Zombie (32 page graphic novella, art by Pedro J. Colombo, November 2018)

Heavy Metal Publishing

Heavy Metal #287: "S.A.T.O" (with Ozzy Osbourne, July 2017)
Megadeth: Death By Design (with Gyula Nemeth, June 2019)
Heavy Metal special: Soft Wood: "Who, M.D" (with Dan Boultwood, June 2019)

IDW Publishing

Doctor Who: The Forgotten (with art by Pia Guerra/Stefano Martino/Kelly Yates, 6-issue limited series, August 2008 - January 2009)
Doctor Who: "The Time Machination" - a 22-page one shot - art by Paul Grist, May 2009
Doctor Who V1 #1-16 (art by various, ongoing series, July 2009)
Doctor Who V2 #1-12 (art by various, ongoing series, January 2011)
Star Trek: The Next Generation / Doctor Who: "Assimilation²" #1-4 (art by J.K Woodward, May 2012)
Doctor Who V3 #13-16 (art by Mike Collins, ongoing series, September 2013

Image Comics

 MacGyver - Fugitive Gauntlet #1 - 5 (miniseries), co-written with Lee David Zlotoff, art by Will Sliney (2013)

Kickstart Entertainment

Danger Academy: 88 page graphic novel (with Dan Boultwood & Ciaran Lucas)

Markosia Publishing

Starship Troopers:
 "Blaze of Glory" (with Sam Hart, previously published through Mongoose Publishing)
 "Dead Man's Hand" (with Neil Edwards)
 "Damaged Justice" (with Shanth Enjeti/Sam Hart)
 "Marooned"(with Chris Dibari, Starship Troopers issues #1-4, April 2007 - July 2007)
The Gloom (with Dan Boultwood, 5-issue mini-series)
Midnight Kiss (with Ryan Stegman/Kieran Oats, 5-issue mini-series)
Shadowmancer (with G.P. Taylor/Pedro Delgado/Ian Sharman, 10-part adaptation)
Brothers - The Fall of Lucifer (with Wendy Alec/Sam Hart - cancelled)
The Doppleganger Chronicles (with G.P. Taylor and Dan Boultwood, graphic novel/prose hybrid)
Hope Falls (with Dan Boultwood, 5-issue mini-series, November 2007 - March 2008, collected as Hope Falls: The Ultimate Edition)
From The Pages Of Bram Stoker's 'Dracula': Harker (with Neil Van Antwerpen/Peter-David Douglas, graphic novel)
Also Known As: (132 page graphic novel, art by Christopher Jones)
Dark Lines of London (with Stephen Saleh/Mariela Malova, graphic novel)

Marvel Comics

X-Men Unlimited #1: "Memories" (with Ben & Ray Lai) 
Amazing Fantasy #18: "Mark Hazzard - MERC" (with Leonard Kirk/Kris Justice)
Spider-Man Family #9: "Identity" (with Ramon Bachs/Kieran Oats)
Amazing Spider-Man Family #5: "Treasure, Hunted" (with Mark Robinson)
Marvel Heroes #31: "Blind Date / Rooftop Gauntlet"

Moonstone

Lady Action One shot (with Jake Minor)
Captain Action Winter Special One shot (various, 2011)

MTV Comics

The Gloom: Ongoing, weekly from February 2011 (with Dan Boultwood)
Agent Mom: Ongoing, weekly from March 2011 (with Alaina Huffman, John Huffman IV, Dan Boultwood and Ciaran Lucas)

Panini Comics
Doctor Who: "FAQ" (with Mike Collins, in Doctor Who Magazine #369-371, 2006)

Pegasus Publishing

 Echoes of Sherlock Holmes: 'Mrs Hudson Investigates' (art by Bevis Musson, 2016)

Rebellion

 Stalag #666 (with art by Jon Davis-Hunt, in 2000 AD #1600-1614, August–November, 2008)
 Citi Def: "Field Trip" (with art by Jack Lawrence, in Judge Dredd Megazine #279-283, January–April 2009)
 Necrophim (with art by Lee Carter):
 "Hell's Prodigal" (in 2000 AD #1655-1665, September–December 2009)
 "Civil Warlord" (in 2000 AD Prog 2011 #1715-1723, December 2010 - March 2011)
 Tales From the Black Museum:
 "The Incredible Teatime Torture Show" (with Vince Locke, in Judge Dredd Megazine #284, May 2009)
 "Who do the Voodoo that you do?" (with Jon Davis-Hunt, in Judge Dredd Megazine #285, June 2009)

The DFC / Random House

The Prince Of Baghdad (14 part story, art by Dan Boultwood, starting August 2008)
St Spooky's School For Girls (8 part story, art by Rob Guillory, comic cancelled before release)

Titan Comics

Wallace and Gromit:
 "Trouser pressed" (in #25)
 "Where Beagles Dare" / "A Close Snip" (in #26)
 Doctor Who: The Tenth Doctor Archives Vol. 1 (various, 2016)
 Doctor Who: The Tenth Doctor Archives Vol. 2 (various, 2016)
 Doctor Who: The Tenth Doctor Archives Vol. 3 (various, 2016)
 Doctor Who: The Eleventh Doctor Archives Vol. 1 (various, 2016)
 Doctor Who: The Eleventh Doctor Archives Vol. 2 (various, 2016)
 Doctor Who: The Eleventh Doctor Archives Vol. 3 (various, 2016)

Walker Books
Outlaw: The Legend Of Robin Hood: (with Sam Hart, 140 page graphic novel, Summer 2009)
Raven's Gate: (adapted from the book by Anthony Horowitz, 160 page graphic novel, art by Dom Reardon, 2010)
Excalibur: The Legend Of King Arthur: (with Sam Hart, 140 page graphic novel, Spring 2011)
Evil Star: (adapted from the book by Anthony Horowitz, 160 page graphic novel, art by Lee O'Connor, 2013)
Messenger: The Legend Of Joan of Arc: (with Sam Hart, graphic novel, February 2014)
Nightrise: (adapted from the book by Anthony Horowitz, 160 page graphic novel, art by Nigel Dobbyn, 2014)
Pirate Queen: The Legend Of Grace O'Malley: (with Sam Hart, graphic novel, 2019)

Other

Trailer Park of Terror #4: "What You Wish For" (with Paul Ridgon, Imperium Comics, 2003)
Digital Webbing Presents #18: "Jigsaw Lady" (with Owen Gieni, Digital Webbing, 2004)

Novels 
Haven Book Group / Badger Learning

 Teen Reads: Jigsaw Lady 
 Teen Reads: Stalker
 Teen Reads: Mister Scratch
 Teen Reads: Noticed
 WOW Facts: Vampires
 WOW Facts: Sherlock Holmes
 Dark Reads: Otis (illustrations by Kev Hopgood)
 Dark Reads: Doctor Jekyll and Little Miss Hyde

Ransom Publishing

 GamerHate

Chinbeard Books

 Robin Of Sherwood: The Trial Of John Little

Amazon Publishing

 Dodge And Twist

As Jack Gatland

 Letter From The Dead 
 Murder Of Angels
 Hunter Hunted
 Whisper For The Reaper
 To Hunt A Magpie 
 A Ritual For The Dying
 Killing The Music
 A Dinner To Die For
 Behind The Wire 
 Heavy Is The Crown
 Stalking The Ripper
 A Quiver of Sorrows
 Paint The Dead 
 Sleeping Soldiers
 The Lionheart Curse
 Steal The Gold

Audios

Audible
Dodge & Twist
Twenty Thousand Leagues Under The Sea

Big Finish
Doctor Who: Rat Trap
Bernice Summerfield: Private Enemy No. 1
Bernice Summerfield: Vesuvius Falling
The Confessions of Dorian Gray: Ghosts of Christmas Past

Spiteful Puppet / ITV

 Robin of Sherwood: The Trial of John Little

Film and TV 
BBC Television

 Doctors: "To Walk In Her Shoes"

Awards
 2006: Midnight Kiss nominated in the "Favourite Small Press Colour Comicbook (British)" Eagle Award
 2007: Starship Troopers nominated in the "Favourite Color Comic Book (British)" Eagle Award
 2008:
 Starship Troopers &  Hope Falls nominated in the "Favourite Color Comic Book (British)" Eagle Award
 Hope Falls nominated in the "Favourite New Comic Book" Eagle Award
 Tony Lee nominated in the "Favourite Newcomer Writer" Eagle Award
 2009:
 Tony Lee nominated in the "Favorite Writer" Eagle Award
 Doctor Who nominated in the "Favourite American Comic Book: Colour" Eagle Award
 Doctor Who nominated in the "Favourite New Comic Book" Eagle Award
 Doctor Who: The Forgotten nominated in the "Favourite Continued Story Published During 2009" Eagle Award
 Doctor Who: The Forgotten nominated in the "Favourite Reprint Collection" Eagle Award
 Doctor Who: The Time Machination nominated in the "Favourite Single Story Published During 2009" Eagle Award
 From The Pages Of Bram Stoker's 'Dracula': Harker nominated in the "Favourite Single Story Published During 2009" Eagle Award
 Outlaw: The Legend Of Robin Hood nominated as a Junior Library Guild Fall Selection
 Outlaw: The Legend Of Robin Hood nominated as an American Library Association 2010 Great Graphic Novels for Teens nomination
 2010:
 Doctor Who nominated in the "Favorite American Comic Book: Colour" Eagle Award
 Doctor Who: Fugitive nominated in the "Favorite Reprint" Eagle Award
 2011:
 Excalibur: The Legend Of King Arthur nominated as an American Library Association 2012 Great Graphic Novels for Teens nomination
 2012:
 Doctor Who #12 winner of the "Favorite Single Issue" Eagle Award

Notes

External links

 

Twitter
Facebook
'Change The Channel'

English comics writers
British graphic novelists
1970 births
People from Hayes, Hillingdon
Living people
People from Wanstead